The seventh generation (Generation VII) of the Pokémon franchise features 86 fictional species of collectible creatures called "Pokémon" introduced to the core video game series in the 2016 Nintendo 3DS games Pokémon Sun and Moon and the 2017 3DS games Pokémon Ultra Sun and Ultra Moon. Two further species were introduced in a 2018 update to the spin-off mobile game Pokémon Go, as well as the 2018 core series Nintendo Switch games Pokémon: Let's Go, Pikachu! and Let's Go, Eevee!, culminating in a total of 88 different species. Some Pokémon species in this generation were introduced in animated adaptations of the franchise before Sun and Moon.

Following Pokémon X and Y, all Pokémon have been designed by a team of roughly 20 artists, led by Ken Sugimori and Hironobu Yoshida. The events of Sun and Moon take place in the fictional region of Alola, composed entirely of tropical islands. Let's Go, Pikachu! and Let's Go, Eevee! are set in the Kanto region, the same setting as generation one. Pokémon Go is an augmented reality mobile game which uses the GPS and camera functions on the players' smartphones to display wild Pokémon in the player’s surrounding environment.

The following list details the 88 Pokémon of Generation seven in order of their National Pokédex number. Pokémon number 722 Rowlet to number 802 Marshadow were introduced in Sun and Moon in 2016 and number 803 Poipole to number 807 Zeraora were released in Ultra Sun and Ultra Moon in 2017. Two mythical Pokémon, Meltan and Melmetal, debuted in Pokémon Go in 2018; Meltan appears in the wild in Pokémon Go when a Pokémon is transferred to Let's Go, Pikachu! or Let's Go, Eevee!, while Melmetal is only obtainable by evolving Meltan in Pokémon Go when the player collects candies. In addition to the new species of Pokémon, two new forms of Zygarde appeared in Sun and Moon—having previously appeared in the Pokémon anime: the dog-like "Zygarde 10% Forme" and mech-like "Zygarde Complete (100%) Forme". Alternate forms that result in type changes and regional forms are included for convenience.

Design and development
Pokémon Sun and Moon introduced "Alola Forms" of various generation I Pokémon. These versions are to represent "the different microclimates in the Alola region". The Alolan versions of Pokémon like Vulpix and Exeggutor have different appearances and types and were introduced alongside generation VII Pokémon. Alex Hern of The Guardian suggested that the developers likely decided to redesign various generation I Pokémon because, according to him, "fan connection with the original 150 Pokémon is as strong as it ever was, the number of people who can tell a Pancham from a Swirlix is much smaller".

List of Pokémon

 Rowlet
 Dartrix
 Decidueye
 Litten
 Torracat
 Incineroar
 Popplio
 Brionne
 Primarina
 Pikipek
 Trumbeak
 Toucannon
 Yungoos
 Gumshoos
 Grubbin
 Charjabug
 Vikavolt
 Crabrawler
 Crabominable
 Oricorio
 Cutiefly
 Ribombee
 Rockruff
 Lycanroc
 Wishiwashi
 Mareanie
 Toxapex
 Mudbray
 Mudsdale
 Dewpider
 Araquanid
 Fomantis
 Lurantis
 Morelull
 Shiinotic
 Salandit
 Salazzle
 Stufful
 Bewear
 Bounsweet
 Steenee
 Tsareena
 Comfey
 Oranguru
 Passimian
 Wimpod
 Golisopod
 Sandygast
 Palossand
 Pyukumuku
 Type: Null
 Silvally
 Minior
 Komala
 Turtonator
 Togedemaru
 Mimikyu
 Bruxish
 Drampa
 Dhelmise
 Jangmo-o
 Hakamo-o
 Kommo-o
 Tapu Koko
 Tapu Lele
 Tapu Bulu
 Tapu Fini
 Cosmog
 Cosmoem
 Solgaleo
 Lunala
 Nihilego
 Buzzwole
 Pheromosa
 Xurkitree
 Celesteela
 Kartana
 Guzzlord
 Necrozma
 Magearna
 Marshadow
 Poipole
 Naganadel
 Stakataka
 Blacephalon
 Zeraora
 Meltan
 Melmetal

Alolan Forms
Various "Alolan Forms" of generation I Pokémon were introduced in Pokémon Sun and Moon.

 Rattata
 Raticate
 Raichu
 Sandshrew
 Sandslash
 Vulpix
 Ninetales
 Diglett
 Dugtrio
 Meowth
 Persian
 Geodude
 Graveler
 Golem
 Grimer
 Muk
 Exeggutor
 Marowak

Notes

References

Lists of Pokémon
Video game characters introduced in 2016